Carlos Andrés Ramírez Silva (born 11 October 1987) is a Uruguayan footballer.

References

1987 births
Living people
People from Durazno Department
Uruguayan footballers
C.D. Social Sol players
Association football forwards